Liverpool in England has a significant number of public parks and gardens. The Register of Historic Parks and Gardens of Special Historic Interest in England describes the city's collection of Victorian parks as the "most important in the country". Liverpool has 10 listed parks and cemeteries, including two Grade I and five Grade II*, more than any other UK city except London.

For many centuries, much of the open space was private estate land. In particular, several of the city's grand houses of the Georgian and Victorian eras are now either demolished or in public ownership, with their grounds and gardens given over to the city. However, several parks which were conceived from the outset as public parks are partly modelled on the nearby Birkenhead Park, which was amongst the first of its type in the world.

Historical background
In 1833, the government's Select Committee on Public Walks emphasised the need to provide accessible space for recreation to improve the health of the urban population, defuse social tensions, and allow social classes to mix. From the early 1850s onwards, Liverpool endorsed this policy with the introduction of a ring of major municipal parks through a significant level of investment in public parks. These included parks such as Princes, Sefton, Wavertree, Shiel, Newsham, and Stanley.

List
This list includes all the parks and open spaces included on the website of Liverpool City Council, all the registered parks and gardens in the National Heritage List for England, and a historic park that is now closed.

Key 

Entry to all of these parks is unrestricted in terms of opening hours, with the exception of the walled botanic garden in Wavertree Park; and free of charge in all cases.

Croxteth Country Park

Today Croxteth Hall & Country Park is managed by Liverpool City Council. This park is an example of a working country estate, with the park featuring the historic Hall itself, surrounded by mature woodlands, a collection of rare breed farm animals in the traditional "Home Farm" yard, and a Victorian walled garden. The Hall is Grade II* listed and the Park Grade II.

Academic studies
Academics from the University of Liverpool's School of History have undertaken research on the historic development of parks and open spaces in the city and their future contribution to community development, education, bio-diversity, public health and urban regeneration. The team have worked to compile the first definitive chronology of the city’s parks over the past 200 years and a book should document the changing role of parks, from their prominence during the Victorian era through to the present day.

References

Bibliography

External links
Council page